Ronnie Lewis (December 22, 1944 – December 3, 2014) was an American politician who served as mayor of Dolton, Illinois, the second African-American mayor to hold the position.

Biography
Lewis was born in Lexington, Mississippi on December 22, 1944 and earned a bachelor of science degree in industrial education from Tennessee State University. In 1966, he moved to Chicago with his wife where he worked in the Chicago Public School system. He then earned a master of arts degree from Roosevelt University in administration and supervision. In the late 1970s, he moved to Dolton. In 1991, he was appointed by Mayor Michael Peck to fill a vacancy on the Village Board becoming Dolton's first Black public official. In 2000, he retired from his position as an assistant principal in the Chicago Public Schools. He was re-elected to the Village Board through 2008 until he was named as interim mayor after the death of mayor William Shaw on November 6, 2008. On February 24, 2009, he defeated Democratic rival Riley H. Roberts in the primary election with 55.31% of the vote. In 2009, he won the general election to a 4-year term as mayor with 1,650 votes defeating Ernest Mickens (514 votes), Charlie Calvin (145 votes), and Sharon Wiley (84 votes) While mayor, he focused on attracting business to Sibley Boulevard. In 2012, he sought to annex the entire Land & Lakes Company's River Bend Prairie landfill (located in Chicago and Dolton) to Dolton after Chicago imposed restrictions on landfill operations in Chicago. He argued it would create jobs for Dolton and had the support of the Village Board. His efforts were rendered moot after Governor Pat Quinn, siding with environmentalists, implemented legislation that would impose similar restrictions statewide. In 2009, he initiated an investigation of the finances of the Dorchester Center, a former Ramada Inn that the suburb had converted into a residence hall for lower-income senior citizens during the Shaw administration and its contract with Victor Shaw, son of the former mayor, whose firm had been paid $1.4 million from 2006 to 2008 to oversee the project. Victor Shaw resigned from his position and in March 2011, Lewis appointed his daughter, Angelique, to oversee the project. Lewis indicated that he needed someone at the Dorchester "who he could trust." The deal was approved with the mayor and three of six trustees voting for the contract.

In 2013, he was defeated in his bid for re-election by Riley H. Rogers.

Personal life
He died on December 3, 2014 of a heart attack; he was survived by his wife Mary (née Blackwell) and two daughters, Angelique and Angeline.

References

1944 births
2014 deaths
African-American mayors in Illinois
21st-century African-American politicians
21st-century American politicians
Roosevelt University alumni
Tennessee State University alumni
People from Lexington, Mississippi